Mill Stream may be:

Castle Mill Stream, Oxford, England
Clewer Mill Stream, Windsor, England
Pevensey Mill Stream, East Sussex, England, source of Sackville Sewer
Mill Stream Nature Reserve, Suffolk, England

See also 
Millstream (disambiguation)
Bush Mill Stream Natural Area Preserve, Virginia, USA
"Down by the Old Mill Stream", a song by Tell Taylor